Harvinder Singh Sodhi (born 17 October 1971) is a former Indian first-class cricketer who played for Madhya Pradesh cricket team between the 1990/91 and 2003/04 seasons.

Sodhi played as an all-rounder who batted right-hand and bowled right-arm medium. He appeared in 76 first-class and 55 List A matches in a career that spanned 13 years between 1990/91 and 2003/04 besides Madhya Pradesh cricket team , Sodhi played for Central Zone cricket team from 1990/91 to 1999/00, Rest of India in 1999/00.

After his playing career, Sodhi turned to coaching. He was appointed Madhya Pradesh cricket team's assistant coach and now current coach of the team.

References

External links
 
 cricketarchive

1971 births
Living people
Indian cricketers
Madhya Pradesh cricketers
Indian cricket coaches
Sportspeople from Agra